Buriticupu is a municipality in Maranhão founded in 1994.  Its population in 2020 was 72,983.

References

Municipalities in Maranhão